On 18 April 2021, a train derailed in the city of Toukh in Qalyubiyya Governorate, Egypt. The accident left 23 people dead and another 139 injured, trapping several under overturned carriages. It was the third major train accident in Egypt recorded in less than a month. Considering the commonality of train wrecks and mishaps in Egypt, prosecutors blamed the negligence of railway employees and the country’s mismanagement.

Investigation 
Preliminary investigations attributed the incident to the increased speed of the Toukh train, which was travelling at 120 km/h on a stretch not designed for speeds exceeding 30km/h. The train's driver, the driver's assistant, and all of the workers of the signs and towers in the area where the crash took place, were taken into custody as part of the investigation.

Response 
President Abdel Fattah Sisi commissioned Prime Minister Mostafa Madbouly to form a committee, to be made up of members of the Administrative Control Authority, the Armed Forces Engineering Authority, and the Military Technical College, to determine the cause of the accident. The transport minister, Kamel Al -Wazir, visited the site of the crash, and declared that those responsible would be held to account. The Ministry of Health redirected 58 ambulances to the scene to transport the injured. Ashraf Raslan, head of the Egyptian railway authority, was fired in the aftermath of the incident.

See also 
 Sohag train collision, another train crash which took place in Egypt three weeks earlier
 List of rail accidents in Egypt

References

 

2021 disasters in Egypt
2021 in Egypt

April 2021 events in Egypt
Derailments in Egypt
Qalyubiyya Governorate
Railway accidents in 2021